Jaroslav Navrátil (born 24 July 1957) is a Czech former professional tennis player.

Navrátil had most of his tennis success while playing doubles. During his career, he achieved a career-high doubles ranking of World No. 31 in 1987. 

He was the captain of the Davis Cup team for the Czech Republic from 2006-2018, including for their 2012 win. 

He is currently coaching fellow Czech player Jiri Vesely.

Career finals

Doubles (2 wins, 4 losses)

References

External links
 
 

Czech male tennis players
Czechoslovak male tennis players
Sportspeople from Přerov
1957 births
Living people